Bruce Reyes-Chow is an American Teaching Elder (minister) of the Presbyterian Church (USA).

Reyes-Chow received his BA in Asian American Studies, Sociology and Religion from San Francisco State University in 1990 and received his Masters of Divinity in 1995 from San Francisco Theological Seminary. He was the pastor of Covenant Presbyterian Church in San Francisco from 1995 to 1999 and from 2000 to 2011 he served as the founding pastor of Mission Bay Community Church in the SOMA District San Francisco, California,  described as a new kind of start-up. In 2011 he was given an honorary Doctor of Divinity degree from Austin College and that same year was named the 2011 San Francisco Theological Seminary Distinguished Alumnus. He has also served as Transitional Pastor and Head of Staff at Valley Presbyterian Church in Portola Valley, CA (2017-2018)and Broadmoor Presbyterian Church in Daly City. CA (2018-2019).

He is currently the Pastor and Head of Staff at First Presbyterian Church of Palo Alto (CA) and a Senior Consultant and Coach with The Center for Progressive Renewal, a non-profit, Atlanta-based church development organization.  He currently blogs for the religion, parenting, and technology sections of The Huffington Post (2011–present) and formerly for the progressive Christians section for Patheos (2011–2014) and the City Brights on SFGate (2009–2012), the online publication for the San Francisco Chronicle.

Reyes-Chow was elected  Moderator of the 218th General Assembly of the Presbyterian Church. He  was elected on June 21, 2008, from a field of four candidates, receiving 48 percent of the vote on the first ballot and 55 percent of the vote on the second ballot. He was at    the youngest Moderator ever elected at 39 years old, and considered to be a representative of the   liberal parts of the church,  while some on the conservative church questioned, "Has the General Assembly put the future of the Presbyterian Church (USA) at greater risk by electing Reyes-Chow as moderator for two years?"  He has been characterized as a radical centrist thinker in USA Today.

He ended his time as Moderator on July 3, 2010, when his successor, Elder Cynthia Bolbach was elected at the 219th General Assembly.

Reyes-Chow is a blogger and has a large social networking presence.  He believes blogging is a spiritual practice and that technology is essential to a young church.

In 2018 Reyes-Chow, a vocal supporter of immigrant and refugee rights, along with 30+ other faith leaders, was arrested at the US Mexico Border as part of an action by the American Friends Service Committee's protest against the militarization of the board and the treatment of refugees.  

In 2010 Reyes-Chow was named to the NUMMI Blue Ribbon Commission by CA State Treasurer, Bill Lockyer tasked with convincing the Toyota Motor Corporation not to close their manufacturing plant in Fremont, CA.

Works
In Defense of Kindness: Why It Matters, How It Changes Our Lives, and How It Can Save the World (Chalice Press, 2021)
Rule #2: Don't Be an Asshat: An Official Handbook for Raising Parents and Children (Bacosa Books, 2016)
40 Days, 40 Prayers, 40 Words: Lenten Reflections for Everyday Life (Westminster John Knox Press, 2015)
But I Don't See You as Asian: Curating Conversations about Race (Kickstarted, Self-Published, 2013)
The Definitive-ish Guide for Using Social Media in the Church (Shook Foil Books, 2012)
Insights from the Underside: An Intergenerational Conversation of Ministers (Broad Mind Press, 2008) Contributing author

References

External links
 Patheos blog
 The Virtual Pastor
 Stockton Native to Lead Church
 Moderator 2.0
 New moderator seeks to unite
 Are Presbyterians Emerging?

Living people
American bloggers
American people of Filipino descent
Presbyterian Church (USA) teaching elders
Protestant religious leaders
People from Stockton, California
San Francisco State University alumni
HuffPost writers and columnists
Radical centrist writers
San Francisco Theological Seminary alumni
Year of birth missing (living people)